Clavus biancae is a species of sea snail, a marine gastropod mollusk in the family Drilliidae.

Description
The length of the shell attains 11 mm.

Distribution
This marine species occurs off Madagascar.

References

 Bozzetti, L., 2008. Tylotiella biancae (Gastropoda: Hypsogastropoda: Drilliidae) nuova specie dal Madagascar meridionale. Malacologia Mostra Mondiale 59: 9–10

External links

biancae
Gastropods described in 2008